The men's tournament of the 2013 European Curling Championships will be held from November 22 to 30 at the Sørmarka Arena in Stavanger, Norway. The winners of the Group C tournament in Tårnby, Denmark will move on to the Group B tournament. The top eight men's teams at the 2013 European Curling Championships will represent their respective nations at the 2014 World Men's Curling Championship in Beijing, China.

Group A

Teams
The teams are listed as follows:

Round-robin standings
Final round-robin standings

Round-robin results

Draw 1
Saturday, November 23, 8:00

Draw 2
Saturday, November 23, 19:30

Draw 3
Sunday, November 24, 12:00

Draw 4
Sunday, November 24, 20:00

Draw 5
Monday, November 25, 14:00

Draw 6
Tuesday, November 26, 8:00

Draw 7
Tuesday, November 26, 16:00

Draw 8
Wednesday, November 27, 9:00

Draw 9
Wednesday, November 27, 19:00

World Challenge Games
The winner of the best-of-three series between the eighth placed team in Group A and the winner of Group B goes to the 2014 World Men's Curling Championship.

Challenge 1
Friday, November 29, 20:00

Challenge 2
Saturday, November 30, 10:00

 advances to the 2014 World Men's Curling Championship.

Playoffs

1 vs. 2
Thursday, November 28, 20:00

3 vs. 4
Thursday, November 28, 20:00

Semifinal
Friday, November 29, 20:00

Bronze-medal game
Saturday, November 30, 10:00

Final
Saturday, November 30, 15:00

Player percentages
Round Robin only

Group B

Teams
The teams are listed as follows:

Yellow Group

Blue Group

Round-robin standings
Final round-robin standings

Round-robin results

Yellow Group

Draw 1 
Friday, November 22, 19:30

Draw 2
Saturday, November 23, 14:30

Draw 3
Sunday, November 24, 8:00

Draw 4
Sunday, November 24, 16:00

Sunday, November 24, 20:00

Draw 5
Monday, November 25, 8:00

Draw 6
Monday, November 25, 16:00

Draw 7
Tuesday, November 26, 8:00

Draw 8
Tuesday, November 26, 16:00

Draw 9
Wednesday, November 27, 8:00

Wednesday, November 27, 12:00

Blue Group

Draw 1

Saturday, November 22, 19:30

Draw 2

Saturday, November 23, 14:30

Draw 3

Sunday, November 24, 8:00

Draw 4

Sunday, November 24, 16:00

Draw 5

Monday, November 25, 8:00

Draw 6

Monday, November 25, 16:00

Draw 7
Tuesday, November 26, 8:00

Draw 8

Tuesday, November 26, 16:00

Draw 9
Wednesday, November 27, 8:00

Tiebreakers
Wednesday, November 27, 16:00

Thursday, November 28, 8:00

Placement game
Wednesday, November 27, 16:00

Playoffs

Y1 vs. B1
Thursday, November 28, 14:00

Y2 vs. B2
Thursday, November 28, 14:00

Semifinal
Thursday, November 28, 20:00

Bronze-medal game
Friday, November 29, 12:00

Final
Friday, November 29, 12:00

Group C

The eight men's teams will play a single round robin, and at its conclusion, the top four teams will advance to the playoffs, which will be held in a format similar to that of the World Wheelchair Curling Championship qualification events. In the playoffs, the first and second seeds will play a semifinal game to determine the first team to advance to the Group B competitions. The loser of this game, along with the winner of the semifinal game played by the third and fourth seeds will advance to the second place game, which determines the second team to advance to the Group B competitions.

Teams
The teams are listed as follows:

Round-robin standings
Final round-robin standings

Round-robin results
All draw times are listed in Central European Time (UTC+1).

Draw 1
Tuesday, October 8, 8:00

Draw 2
Tuesday, October 8, 16:00

Draw 3
Wednesday, October 9, 9:00

Draw 4
Wednesday, October 9, 19:00

Draw 5
Thursday, October 10, 12:00

Draw 6
Thursday, October 10, 20:00

Draw 7
Friday, October 11, 13:00

Playoffs

Semifinals
Saturday, October 12, 9:00

Second Place Game
Saturday, October 12, 14:00

References
General

Specific

External links

2013 in curling
European Curling Championships